The Gadubanud (Katubanut), also known as the Pallidurgbarran, Yarro waetch or Cape Otway tribe (Tindale), are an Aboriginal Australian people of the state of Victoria. Their territory encompasses the rainforest plateau and rugged coastline of Cape Otway. They were thought to have become extinct quickly following the onset of European colonisation, and little is known of them. However, some may have found refuge at the Wesleyan mission station at Birregurra, and later the Framlingham mission station, and some people still trace their descent from such a remnant.

Today, by the principle of succession, the Gunditjmara are considered the traditional custodians of Gadubanud lands.

Name
"Gadubanud/Katubanut" appears to have meant "King Parrot language", and is considered to have been an exonym applied to the people by tribes to their west, perhaps with a pejorative colouring.

Language

Almost no linguistic material has been recorded for the Gadubanud language. A connection with the Gulidjan to their north is suggested in the literature. Their tongue was first identified as signifying "king parrot language" by James Dawson in 1881.

Country
The Katubanut inhabited the rainforest plateau and rugged coastline of the Cape Otway peninsula, and the centre of their land is thought to have probably been at Apollo Bay. The extent of their territory is not known. Their habitat consisted of rainforests ("jarowaitj"), composed of giant eucalypts and southern beeches, which were scarce in food resources and flush with dingo packs, and adjacent sclerophyll woodlands, as well as the wetlands of the Barwon River headwaters, and abundant river estuaries on the coast, providing, according to the nature of the seasons, ecosystems rich in food sources. The area they dwelt in has been shown by John Mulvaney's archaeological work, and more recent studies in the Aire river area, to have been occupied for several centuries, one site going back 1,000 years.

History of contact
Much like the Bidawal lands of far eastern Gippsland, early European settlers thought the Otway peninsula was an impenetrable haven for an indeterminate number of Aboriginal people, who used its impenetrable and cold rainforest as a refuge, while venturing out at times to filch food and blankets from outstations. In doing so, however, they were not known for resorting to "savage violence".

According to native oral history, the Gadubanud were wiped out in a war when neighbouring tribes set fire to their forests, causing them to expire through suffocation. They appear to have been regarded as "wild blacks" by their neighbours, the Wathaurong to the northeast and the Girai wurrung on their west. However, Norman Tindale dates their extinction to some years after the beginnings of European colonisation of the area.

From notes made by the chief Protector of Aborigines, George Robinson, who came across three members of the tribe at the mouth of the Hopkins River in 1842, some  beyond their traditional lands, in Djagurd territory, it has been surmised that they had some linguistic affiliation with this group. That year they appear to have robbed an outstation for food and blankets In March 1846, on his third attempt to penetrate the Otway area, the district superintendent for Port Philip Bay, Charles La Trobe, encountered seven Gadubanud men and women in the Aire Valley. On the Gellibrand River a month later, Henry Allan found one of their camps, full of implements, and in mid-winter of the same year, the surveyor George D Smythe came across eight: a man, four women and three boys. The group assisted Smythe by pointing out the track leading to Gunna-waar Creek (Airedale), and, in gratitude, Smythe issued them with a note instructing his coxswain to provide them with flour at Blanket Bay. Four days later, he heard that one member of his party, the seaman James Conroy, had been killed by a local native, though the circumstances leading to his death are unknown.

Blanket Bay massacre
Smythe, whose deeds of violence were to assume notorious proportions among settlers, decided to retaliate and, on returning to Melbourne, organized an expedition to return to the Otways, picking up several Wathaurong in Geelong in August 1846. According to Bruce Pascoe, he had been given a mandate by Latrobe simply to arrest the suspected culprit, Meenee Meenee, a Gadubanud warrior, the only one whose name is known, with a reputation for vigorously defending territory from intruders. The party, which included several Wathaurung people, came across seven Gadubanud at the mouth of the Aire River (whose estuary was known as Gunuwarra (swan) in the Gadubanud language) on Blanket Bay and murdered them. A report of the massacre was published in The Argus of 1 September 1846. From this time, nothing more is reported of the Gadubanud in colonial records, apart from a couple of newspaper articles that recalled the incident with some contradictory details.

One such story is by Aldo Massola who detailed the following account:
'In 1848 one of two survivors, a woman who then lived in Warrnambool, told the story: One of the white men had interfered with a lubra, and her husband had killed the aggressor. The Black Police had come shortly after and had shot down indiscriminately the whole of her group, about twenty men, women and children. She and another lubra were only slightly wounded, and hid themselves in the scrub until the attackers left the scene of the massacre.  As far as she knew they were the only survivors.'

According to an article in The Age (8 January 1887), Smythe attacked when the group was asleep, and managed to kill all of them, except for one young woman who had sought refuge behind a tree. She was, in this version, the only survivor, and was taken away, being later adopted into the Woi wurrung tribe.

Notwithstanding distortions in these reports, which fuse apparently distinct actions, it would appear that a second attack took place near the Aire River in the following year, 1847, when a detachment of Native Police Corps, led by Foster Fyans, slaughtered another group, while kidnapping two surviving children, a girl and a boy. The latter was later killed on a squatter's station by one of the "friendly natives" who had helped the raiding party, to prevent him from revenging the deaths on his maturity.

In 1848, a report in the Geelong Advertiser, commenting on a tribal fight that took place near Port Fairy, describing one of the two blacks killed as "a man who belonged to the Cape Otway tribe, the last of his race".

By that time, the Otways were open to European settlement. William Roadknight, who had formerly mustered a posse to help Smythe in hunting the Gadubanud, cut a track through the valley of Wild Dog Creek and set up the first cattle station in the Otway peninsula. The destruction of the Gadubanud, who had practised fire-stick farming to clear trails through the forests and bushland, restored the Otways to a state of wild regrowth that made travelling arduous, until the great January 1851 bushfire ravaged much of the forest.

Social structure, economy and customs
George Robinson states that the Katubanut were composed of at least four clans. Ian Clark has speculated that they might have had some links to the Gulidjan.

Before European settlement, five separate clans existed, listed by Clark as follows:

One of the Otway clans was associated with a place called Bangurer.

Subsistence economy
As semi-nomads, the Gadubanud roved from the inland rainforest plateau through wetlands to the coast and its estuaries, and their diet would have varied according to the seasons. It consisted of varieties of protein-rich fish, eels, waterfowl and birds. The lacustrine and wetland zones at Gerangamete, Irrewillipe and Chapple Vale afforded reliable food resources. Nutriment was readily available by harvesting the over 200 species of local starchy tubers, such as water-ribbons (Triglochin procera) and the club-rush (Scirpus maritimus), together with tall spike rush (Eleocharis sphacelata)) rhizomes. Inland, they could rely on a plethora of carbohydrate food from yam daisies (or murnong yams), which were cultivated using frequent burn-offs to clear patches of forest. The forests also yielded bracken ferns whose pith is more nutritious than potatoes. Protein-rich food was secured by culling native bush rats, indigenous mice, possums, snakes, lizards, frogs, birds and their eggs, eastern grey kangaroos, red-necked wallabys, brushtail possums, sugar gliders and fat-tailed dunnarts.

Throughout the Otways region, some 276 Aboriginal archaeological sites had been identified by 1998, 73 in the Aire River valley alone. A site at Seal Point, dating back 1,500 years, some 400 metres long, 100 metres wide and with a depth of ca.1.5 metres, has been described by Harry Lourandos as "the most complex and bountiful of all southwestern Victorian middens". Archaeological examinations of Aire River middens have uncovered both intertidal mollusc and freshwater mussel remains, together with parrot-fish residues and snails. At Seal Point, archaeologists have disinterred what looks like a warm weather camp, used from spring to early summer, including pit huts, whose remains attest to a diet based on two species of marine animals, the elephant and brown fur seals, and possums, wrasse and bracken ferns, as well as an industrial production of stone tools.

The local Lorne Historical Society states that the Gadubanud people traded spear wood for Mount William green stone mined by the Wurundjeri.

Niewójt suggests that the account, in the reminiscences of William Buckley, of an encounter with a tribe numbering about 80 people, for trading purposes, that took place at Bermongo on the Barwon River, was probably with the Yan Yan Gurt clan, perhaps exchanging the prized tuupuurn eel for baskets of tubers.

Report of cannibalism
The Gadubanud were considered mainmait (wild/of alien speech) by neighbouring tribes such as the Wathaurong and Girai Wurring.

There is a lurid account in the reminiscences of William Buckley concerning the practice of cannibalism imputed to the tribe. Buckley was an escaped English convict who spent over three decades among the aborigines, chiefly the Wathaurong of the area around Geelong. In touching on the topic he related that:
'In my wanderings about, I met with the Pallidurgbarrans, a tribe notorious for their cannibal practices; not only eating human flesh greedily after a fight, but on all occasions when it was possible. They appeared to be the nearest approach to the brute creation of any I had ever seen or heard of; and, in consequence, they were very much dreaded. Their colour was light copper, their bodies having tremendously large and protrubing [sic] bellies. Huts, or artificial places for shelter, were unknown to them it being their custom to lay about in the scrub, anyhow and anywhere.  The women appeared to be most unnaturally ferocious-children being their most valued sacrifice. Their brutality at length became so harassing, and their assaults so frequent, that it was resolved to set fire to the bush where they had sheltered themselves, and so annihilate them, one and all, by suffocation. This, in part, succeeded, for I saw no more of them in my time. The belief is, that the last of the race was turned into a stone, or rock, at a place where a figure was found resembling a man, and exceedingly well executed; probably the figure-head of some unfortunate ship'.

The charge that Australian natives practiced cannibalism in the usual acceptance of the word — consuming human flesh for nutriment or to strike terror into one's enemies — is now broadly dismissed as a misinterpretation of a custom restricted to funerary rites.

Tim Flannery, in editing Buckley's account, commented:
When reading about the Bunyip and Pallidurgbarrans, we need to remember that Buckley was a rural Cheshireman who doubtless believed implicitly in the faeries and hobgoblins of his homeland. Likewise, the Aboriginal people who were educating Buckley about their environment made no clear division between myth and material reality ... There is not the slightest impression that Buckley is reporting anything but what he sensed was true, yet for the modern reader there is equally little doubt that bunyips and Pallidurgbarrans are mythical beings.

Alternative names
 Katubanut
 Pallidurgbarran
 Yarro waetch. This is explained by Norman Tindale as an 'ecological term of the form jarowaitj employed by aborigines to their west to describe the cold rain forests of Cape Otway, which constituted the Katubanut's habitat.

Notes

Citations

Sources

Aboriginal peoples of Victoria (Australia)
Extinct ethnic groups
History of Victoria (Australia)
Otway Ranges